Jules Androkae (born July 12, 1964 in Bekitro) is a Malagasy politician. He is a member of the Senate of Madagascar for Androy, and is a member of the Tiako I Madagasikara party.

References

1964 births
Living people
Members of the Senate (Madagascar)
Tiako I Madagasikara politicians
People from Androy